Rafael Kazior (born 7 February 1983) is a German retired professional footballer who played as a forward.

Career
On 12 September 2003, Kazior made his professional debut in the 2. Bundesliga for MSV Duisburg.

In May 2018, following Werder Bremen II's relegation from the 3. Liga, it was announced Kazior would end his career and start working as a video analyst for Werder Bremen's first team under Florian Kohfeldt.

Career statistics

References

1983 births
Living people
German footballers
German people of Polish descent
Association football forwards
MSV Duisburg players
SV Wacker Burghausen players
Holstein Kiel players
Rot-Weiss Essen players
Hamburger SV II players
People from Gliwice
2. Bundesliga players
3. Liga players
Regionalliga players
SV Werder Bremen non-playing staff